David Thomas Gruffydd Evans, Baron Evans of Claughton, DL (9 February 1928 – 22 March 1992) was a British solicitor and politician. As Lord Evans, held the office of Deputy Lieutenant of Merseyside. He was created a life peer as Baron Evans of Claughton, of Claughton in the County of Merseyside, on 24 April 1978.

Evans was born in Birkenhead. His family were Welsh-speaking, originally from Anglesey. He studied at Birkenhead School and later at Liverpool University. Over a period he served on Birkenhead County Borough Council, Wirral Borough Council and finally Merseyside Council, leading the Liberal group. He tried twice, in 1964 and 1966, to win a parliamentary seat but was unsuccessful. As President of the Liberal Party in 1977-78, he played an important role in dealing with the fall-out from the controversy relating to the activities of former party leader Jeremy Thorpe.

References

1928 births
1992 deaths
Alumni of the University of Liverpool
Chairs of the Liberal Party (UK)
Deputy Lieutenants of Merseyside
Life peers created by Elizabeth II
Evans of Claughton 
Liberal Democrats (UK) life peers
People educated at Birkenhead School
Presidents of the Liberal Party (UK)
Welsh-speaking politicians